Martin Beevers (born 11 June 1946) is a British fencer. He competed in the team épée event at the 1976 Summer Olympics.

References

1946 births
Living people
British male fencers
Olympic fencers of Great Britain
Fencers at the 1976 Summer Olympics